Howell Peacock (September 11, 1889 – 1962) was an American basketball coach, best known for being the head coach of men's college basketball at the University of Georgia and at the University of North Carolina.

University of Georgia
Peacock played for the Georgia men's basketball team and was team captain for the 1909–10 and 1911–12 seasons.  After playing on the team, Peacock became the head coach for Georgia in 1912 and coached the bulldogs for the next four seasons.  Peacock amassed a 30–7 record while coaching for the University of Georgia.

Coaching at North Carolina
After leaving the University of Georgia, Peacock became head coach at North Carolina while being simultaneously enrolled as a medical student there. Peacock took over after the departure of Charles Doak as head coach. When Doak left, many of his players also graduated, leaving Peacock to build the team mostly from scratch. In order to field a full team, Peacock recruited players from all over campus by posting signs up, asking men to come and try out for the team.  Ten individuals showed up for try-outs and three made it onto the team. The 1916–17 team barely managed to earn a winning record, but did manage to beat Virginia, which was considered a moral victory. The 1916–17 team also included a future Governor of North Carolina Luther H. Hodges and General F. Carlylel Shepard.

The 1917–18 team managed to win all of its home games and became one of the best teams in the South. Peacock's third and final season with the Tar Heels was largely a disappointment, however, as the Tar Heels went 9–7 in the 1918–19 season.

Head coaching record

Sources

References

1889 births
1962 deaths
American men's basketball coaches
Georgia Bulldogs basketball coaches
Georgia Bulldogs basketball players
North Carolina Tar Heels men's basketball coaches
American men's basketball players